Kumquats, or cumquats in Australian English, are a group of small fruit-bearing trees in the flowering plant family Rutaceae. Their taxonomy is disputed. They were previously classified as forming the now-historical genus Fortunella or placed within Citrus, . Different classifications have alternatively assigned them to anywhere from a single species, C. japonica, to numerous species representing each cultivar. Recent genomic analysis would define three pure species, Citrus hindsii, C. margarita and C. crassifolia, with C. x japonica being a hybrid of the last two.

The edible fruit closely resembles the orange (Citrus sinensis) in color and shape but is much smaller, being approximately the size of a large olive. The kumquat is a fairly cold-hardy citrus.

Etymology 
The English name "kumquat" is a borrowing of the Cantonese gāmgwāt.

In Japanese, 'kinkan' has a symbolic meaning that involves wordplay. Kinkan (金柑 “kumquat”) is a homonym of kinkan (金冠), or “golden crown.”

Origin 
The kumquat plant is native to Southern China. The historical reference to kumquats appears in Imperial literature from at least the 12th century. They have long been cultivated in other parts of East Asia (Japan), South Asia (India), and Southeast Asia (especially the Philippines). They were introduced to Europe in 1846 by Robert Fortune, collector for the London Horticultural Society, and shortly thereafter were taken to North America.

Description 
Kumquat plants have thornless branches and extremely glossy leaves. They bear dainty white flowers that occur in clusters or individually inside the leaf axils. They bear yellowish-orange fruits that are oval or round in shape. The fruits can be  in diameter and have a sweet, pulpy skin and slightly acidic inner pulp. All the kumquat trees are self-pollinating. Kumquats can tolerate both frigid and hot temperatures.

Varieties 
Citrus taxonomy is complicated and controversial. Different systems place various types of kumquats in different species or unite them into as few as two species. Botanically, many of the varieties of kumquats are classified as their own species, rather than a cultivar. Historically they were viewed as falling within the genus Citrus, but the Swingle system of citrus taxonomy elevated them to their own genus, Fortunella. Recent phylogenetic analysis suggests they do fall within Citrus. Swingle divided the kumquats into two subgenera, the Protocitrus, containing the primitive Hong Kong kumquat, and Eufortunella, comprising the round, oval kumquat, Meiwa kumquats, to which Tanaka added two others, the Malayan kumquat and the Jiangsu kumquat. Chromosomal analysis suggested that Swingle's Eufortunella represent a single 'true' species, while Tanaka's additional species were revealed to be likely hybrids of Fortunella with other Citrus, so-called xCitrofortunella.

One recent genomic analysis concluded there was only one true species of kumquat, but the analysis did not include the Hong Kong variety seen as a distinct species in all earlier analyses. A 2020 review concluded that genomic data were insufficient to reach a definitive conclusion on which kumquat cultivars represented distinct species. In 2022, a genome-level analysis of cultivated and wild varieties drew several conclusions. The authors found support for the division of kumquats into subgenera: Protocitrus, for the wild Hong Kong variety, and Eufortunella for the cultivated varieties, with a divergence predating the end of the Quaternary glaciation, perhaps between two ancestral populations isolated south and north, respectively, of the Nanling mountain range. Within the latter group, the oval, round and Meiwa kumquat each showed a level of divergence greater than between other recognized citrus species, such as between pomelo and citron, and hence each merits species-level classification. Though Swingle had speculated that the Meiwa kumquat was a hybrid of oval and round kumquats, the genomic analysis suggested instead that the round kumquat was an oval/Meiwa hybrid.

Hong Kong kumquat 
The Hong Kong kumquat (Citrus hindsii or Fortunella hindsii) produces only pea-sized bitter and acidic fruit with very little pulp and large seeds. It is primarily grown as an ornamental plant, though it is also found in southern China growing in the wild. Not only is it the most primitive of the kumquats, but with the kumquats being the most primitive citrus, Swingle described it as the closest to the ancestral species from which all citrus evolved. While the wild Hong Kong kumquat is tetraploid, there is a commercial diploid variety, the Golden Bean kumquat with slightly larger fruit.

Meiwa kumquat 
The Meiwa kumquat (Citrus crassifolia or Fortunella crassifolia) was brought to Japan from China at the end of the 19th century. It is a hybrid of Nagami and Marumi. it has seedy oval fruits and thick leaves and was characterized as a different species by Swingle. Its fruit is typically eaten skin and all.

Oval kumquat 
The oval kumquat or Nagami kumquat (Citrus margarita or Fortunella margarita if dividing Eufortunella kumquats into separate species) is ovoid in shape and typically eaten whole, skin and all. The inside is still quite sour, but the skin has a very sweet flavour, so when eaten together an unusual tart-sweet, refreshing flavour is produced. The fruit ripens mid- to late winter and always crops very heavily, creating a spectacular display against the dark green foliage. The tree tends to be much smaller and dwarf in nature, making it ideal for pots and occasionally bonsai cultivation.

The 'Centennial Variegated' kumquat cultivar arose spontaneously from the oval kumquat. It produces a greater proportion of fruit to peel than the oval kumquat, and the fruit are rounder and sometimes necked. Fruit are distinguishable by their variegation in color, exhibiting bright green and yellow stripes, and by its lack of thorns.

Round kumquat 
The round kumquat, Marumi kumquat, or Morgani kumquat (retaining the name Citrus japonica or Fortunella japonica when kumquats are divided into multiple species) is an evergreen tree that produces edible golden-yellow fruit. The fruit is small and usually spherical but can be oval shaped. The peel has a sweet flavor, but the fruit has a distinctly sour center. The fruit can be eaten cooked but is mainly used to make marmalades, jellies, and other spreads. The tree can be used in bonsai cultivation. The plant symbolizes good luck in China and other Asian countries, where it is often kept as a houseplant and given as a gift during the Lunar New Year. Round kumquats are more commonly cultivated than other species due to their high cold tolerance.

Jiangsu kumquat 
The Jiangsu kumquat or Fukushu kumquat (Citrus obovata or Fortunella obovata) bears edible fruit that can be eaten raw, as well as made into jelly and marmalade. The fruit can be round or bell-shaped and is bright orange when fully ripe. The plant can be distinguished from other kumquats by its distinctly round leaves. It is typically grown for its edible fruit and as an ornamental plant; it cannot withstand frost, however, unlike the round kumquat which has a high cold tolerance. These kumquats are often seen near the Yuvraj section of the Nayak Province. Chromosomal analysis showed this variety to be a likely hybrid.

Malayan kumquat 
The Malayan kumquat (Fortunella polyandra or Tanaka's Fortunella swinglei - in Citrus it would be C. x swinglei), from the Malay Peninsula where it is known as the "hedge lime" (limau pagar), is another hybrid, perhaps a limequat. It has a thin peel on larger fruit compared to other kumquats.

Cultivation and uses 
Kumquats are much hardier than citrus plants such as oranges. Sowing seed in the spring is most ideal because the temperature is pleasant with more chances of rain and sunshine. This also gives the tree enough time to become well established before winter. Early spring is the best time to transplant a sapling. They do best in direct sunlight (needing 6–7 hours a day) and planted directly in the ground. Kumquats do well in USDA hardy zones 9 and 10 and can survive in temperatures as low as 18 degrees F (-7 degrees C). On trees mature enough, kumquats will form in about 90 days.

In cultivation in the UK, Citrus japonica has gained the Royal Horticultural Society’s Award of Garden Merit (confirmed 2017).

Propagation and pollination 
Kumquats do not grow well from seeds and so are vegetatively propagated by using rootstock of another citrus fruit, air layering, or cuttings.

Composition 
The essential oil of the kumquat peel contains much of the aroma of the fruit, and is composed principally of limonene, which makes up around 93% of the total. Besides limonene and alpha-pinene (0.34%), both of which are considered monoterpenes, the oil is unusually rich (0.38% total) in sesquiterpenes such as α-bergamotene (0.021%), caryophyllene (0.18%), α-humulene (0.07%) and α-muurolene (0.06%), and these contribute to the spicy and woody flavor of the fruit. Carbonyl compounds make up much of the remainder, and these are responsible for much of the distinctive flavor. These compounds include esters such as isopropyl propanoate (1.8%) and terpinyl acetate (1.26%); ketones such as carvone (0.175%); and a range of aldehydes such as citronellal (0.6%) and 2-methylundecanal. Other oxygenated compounds include nerol (0.22%) and Trans-lialool oxide (0.15%).

Hybrids 

Hybrid forms of the kumquat include the following:
 Calamansi: mandarin orange x kumquat
 Citrangequat: citrange x kumquat
 Limequat: key lime x kumquat
 Orangequat: Satsuma mandarin x kumquat
 Procimequat: limequat x kumquat
 Sunquat: Meyer lemon (?) x kumquat
 Yuzuquat: yuzu x kumquat

Gallery

See also 
 Kumquat Festival

References

Further reading 
 Burkill, I. H. (1931). "An enumeration of the species of Paramignya, Atalantia and Citrus, found in Malaya". Gard. Bull. Straits Settlem. 5: 212–220.
 Mabberley, D. J. (1998). "Australian Citreae with notes on other Aurantioideae (Rutaceae)" (PDF). Telopea 7 (4): 333–344.

External links 

 

Citrus
Flora of temperate Asia
Flora of tropical Asia
Fruits originating in East Asia
Garden plants of Asia
Ornamental trees

Fruit trees